Nellie Wong (born 12 September 1934) is an American poet and activist for feminist and socialist causes. Wong is also an active member of the Freedom Socialist Party and Radical Women.

Biography
Wong was born in Oakland, California to Chinese immigrants. Her father had immigrated to Oakland in 1912. Wong is a Chinese American poet, feminist, and socialist who has organized and participated in activist groups working to create better conditions for women, workers, and minorities.

During World War II, the Wong family worked in a grocery store in Berkeley. The internment of her Japanese American neighbors left a profound impact on her intellectual development, sensitizing her to issues of racism and the concerns of Asian Americans. The family borrowed $2,000 to start a restaurant, The Great China, in Oakland's Chinatown, where Wong worked as a waitress during her youth. She attended public school, graduating from Oakland High School, and started bull work as a secretary for the Bethlehem Steel Corporation, a position she held until 1982. She later served as senior analyst in affirmative action at the University of California, San Francisco (UCSF).

While in her mid-30s, Wong began studying creative writing at San Francisco State University (SFSU) and began to write and publish her poetry. Wong credits her feminist classmates at SFSU with encouraging her writing. A male professor had once told her to throw away an angry poem she had written. One classmate told her, "You don't have to listen to him!"

While a student at San Francisco State University, Wong was involved with the campus Women Writers Union, which organized around issues of race, sex, and class. In the late 1970s, alongside lesbian activist and writer Merle Woo, Wong organized the feminist literary and performance group Unbound Feet. The group performed at colleges, universities, and community centers. During this time she encountered members of two affiliated socialist feminist organizations, Radical Women and the Freedom Socialist Party, and within a few years had joined their ranks.

In 1983, Wong traveled to China on the first U.S. Women Writers Tour to China sponsored by the US–China Peoples Friendship Association with Tillie Olsen, Alice Walker, Paule Marshall. Also in 1983 she was a major organizer of the Merle Woo Defense Committee. Woo, a lesbian Korean-Chinese American feminist, had filed a complaint against their former employer alleging wrongful termination based on discrimination. Working with other Freedom Socialist Party and Radical Women members, Wong raised funds and awareness of the case. Two legal cases were won against the defendant.

From 1983 to 1985 Wong taught poetry writing at Mills College in Oakland and playwriting at the Asian American Theater Company in San Francisco.

During the 1980s and 1990s, Wong was keynote speaker at many national and regional conferences, including Third World Women and Feminist Perspectives, Women Against Racism, and the National Women's Studies Association. She has recited her poetry in China, Cuba, and throughout the U.S. She has also participated on panels concerning labor, Asian American literature, and poetry. Furthermore, Wong has taught Women's studies at the University of Minnesota and poetry writing at Mills College in Oakland, California.

Excerpts from two her poems have been permanently installed as plaques at public sites at the San Francisco Municipal Railway. She has received awards from the Women's Foundation (San Francisco), University of California, Santa Barbara's Asian American Faculty and Staff Association, and the San Francisco-based Kearny Street Workshop, a multidisciplinary art collective. She served many years as the Bay Area organizer of the Freedom Socialist Party, and is still active with the party, Radical Women, and Bay Area United Against War. She currently resides in San Francisco.

Work
Wong's first collection of poetry, Dreams in Harrison Railroad Park (1977), was published by Kelsey Street Press. This book went through four printings and was the most successful release in the history of Kelsey Street Press. Her other titles are The Death of Long Steam Lady (1986), published by West End Press and Stolen Moments (1997). Her work has appeared in approximately 200 anthologies and publications.

Wong writes directly from her working life; she states "A lot of my poems come from the workplace; that's where I've experienced a great deal of sexism and racism." Other themes include her family history and Asian American identity, about which she has said, "I care about the roots of Asian American culture and how and why they came here [...] It's something every Asian family has experienced." Her poetry spans issues of feminism, the fight against racism, workplace injustice, and finding identity as a writer and activist.

In 1981, Wong participated with Mitsuye Yamada in the documentary film Mitsuye & Nellie, Asian American Poets, produced by Allie Light and Irving Saraf. The film recounts the experiences and hardships that affected the writers and their families. Significant to the film's focus is how World War II and the bombing of Pearl Harbor encouraged divisive perceptions of Japanese as "bad" Asians, while the Chinese were seen as "good" Asians. "Can't Tell," one of the poems Wong recites in the film, highlights the author's attempt to understand why her Japanese neighbors were being sent to internment camps when she and her family, as Chinese Americans, were considered patriotic citizens.

The film also shows lively exchanges between Wong and her siblings, highlighting the feistiness of her older sister, Li Keng, also an author, and her youngest sister, Flo Oy Wong, an installation artist. Her brother, William Wong, is a journalist and the author of Yellow Journalist: Dispatches from Asian America.

Her papers are housed at the California Ethnic and Multicultural Archives.

Bibliography

Books
 Wong, Nellie. Breakfast Lunch Dinner: Poems. Meridien Press Works, 2012.

Other
 When I Was Growing Up, autobiographical poem
 In search of the self as hero: confetti of voices on New Year's night, 
 For an Asian woman who says my poetry gives her a stomachache, 
 Broad shoulders, 
 Moving to her new house, and We go as American tourists, 
 A woman at the window, 
 So near, so far, My Chinese love, Unwritten letter, Reverberations, Give me no flowers, Where is my country, When I was growing up, and Away from the blue swans, 
 Socialist Feminism, 
 Dreams in Harrison Railroad Park, Can't tell, On thinking of photographing my fantasies, On Plaza Garibaldi, and Picnic, 
 Relining shelves and Toward a 44th birthday, 
 Wong, Nellie. "Praise Song for a Dead Girl." Seeds of Fire: Contemporary Poetry of the Other U. S. A., edited by Jonathan Andersen. Smokestack Books, 2008. p. 155.
 A poem of solidarity for the striking Liverpool dockers and the women and the waterfront, 
 Exploring common differences, Miss Saigon: money calls a racist tune, and You were born, 
 Can't tell,

References

Further reading
 Moraga, Cherríe, and Anzalduá Gloria. This Bridge Called my Back Writings by Radical Women of Color. SUNY Press, 2015.
 The Making of a Poem: A Norton Anthology of Poetic Forms. Edited by Mark Strand and Eavan Boland (New York: W.W. Norton and Company, 2000).
 Review of Stolen Moments. Reviewed by Cindy Lum. Hawaii Pacific Review. Volume 13 (1999), Hawaii Pacific University, Honolulu, HI.
 Revolutionary Spirits: Profiles of Asian Pacific American Activists, by Dana Kawaoka, American Studies Senior Thesis, June 1, 1998.
 Mitsuye & Nellie, Asian American Poets. Allie Light & Irving Saraf. Women Make Movies. 1981. 58 min.
 On Women Turning 60: Embracing the Age of Fulfillment. Interviews and photography by Cathleen Rountree (New York: Harmony Books, 1997).
 Women: Images and Realities, A Multicultural Anthology. Edited by Amy Kesselman, Lily D. McNair, Nancy Schniedewind (Mountain View, CA:, Mayfield Publishing Company, 1995).
 A Formal Feeling Comes. Edited by Annie Finch (Brownsville, OR: Story Line Press, 1994).
 Asian American Literature: An Annotated Bibliography. Edited by King-kok Cheung and Stan Yogi. (New York: Modern Language Association of America, 1988).
 Guide to Women's Literature throughout the World. Edited by Claire Buck (Bloomsbury Publishing, 1994).
 Feminists Who Changed America, 1963-1975. Edited by Barbara J. Love (Champaign: University of Illinois Press, 2006).

External links
 Guide to the Nellie Wong Papers at the California Ethnic and Multicultural Archives

1934 births
Living people
American academics of Chinese descent
American socialists
American writers of Chinese descent
American poets
American feminist writers
Writers from Oakland, California
Writers from the San Francisco Bay Area
American socialist feminists
American women poets
Poets from California
Bethlehem Steel people
21st-century American women